Barace is a surname. Notable people with the surname include:

Cipriano Barace (1641–1702), Spanish Jesuit, missionary, and martyr
Javier Eseverri Barace (born 1977), Spanish futsal player